Frank Fleming is a sculptor from Birmingham, Alabama

References

Possible references
 Frank Fleming sculptures, Al Sella paintings among iconic works discovered at Artists Incorporated in Birmingham  James R. Nelson, December 14, 2008
Alabama sculptor Frank Fleming arrested in undercover sting in Huntsville August 22, 2008
Gov. Riley Announces Artists Featured in Year of Alabama Arts
, by Al Head, AlabamaArts, Volume XXI, Number 2

Works by Fleming

External links
Frank Fleming - Bhamwiki
Sculpture View
SIRIS - Smithsonian Institution Research Information System

Living people
University of Alabama alumni
Artists from Alabama
20th-century American sculptors
20th-century American male artists
21st-century American sculptors
21st-century American male artists
Year of birth missing (living people)